The 5th National Film Awards was presented by the Ministry of Information, Bangladesh to recognise the best of Bangladeshi cinema released in the year 1979. The ceremony took place in Dhaka in 1980 and awards were given by the President of Bangladesh.

List of winners
A total of 16 awards were given for this year. The award for Best Actor was not given this year.

Merit awards

Technical awards

Special Award
 Best Child Artist - Master Lelin (Surjo Dighol Bari)

See also
Bachsas Awards
Meril Prothom Alo Awards
Ifad Film Club Award
Babisas Award

References

External links

National Film Awards (Bangladesh) ceremonies
1979 film awards
1980 film awards
1979 awards in Bangladesh
1980 awards in Bangladesh
1981 in Dhaka
November 1981 events in Bangladesh